Henry Mellish School and Specialist Sports College was a small, non-denominational secondary school in Bulwell, Nottingham, England, situated in an area of high social deprivation.

History

Early history
The school was founded as a boys' grammar school in 1929 - the Henry Mellish Grammar School, and named after Eton-educated Henry Mellish, a British Army colonel and local councillor, who died two years prior to the opening. The school was sited near the Highbury Vale tram stop and opposite the Highbury Hospital on Highbury Road (B682).

The school competed in the radio series Top of the Form in Heat 2 for England on Monday 8 October 1956 at 7.30pm on the Light Programme. It lost against a grammar school team from the West Midlands.

School specifics
Towards the end of its lifespan the subjects taught at the school were:
 English
 Maths
 Science
 Geography
 Textiles
 Art
 ICT
 PE
 Workshop

Closure in 2009
The school was closed on 6 June 2009 in preparation for the opening of The Bulwell Academy. This merged the school with the other major educational institute in the local area, River Leen (formerly Alderman Derbyshire). Originally the merge of these two school was deemed unthinkable by local residents due to the overwhelming rivalry between the two schools.

Former Head Teacher, Mr. Graham Roberts has notably gone on to also be the head of the merged Bulwell Academy.

The close of the school came a shock to many current and former students, being one of the fastest improving schools in the city. Improvements such as the relatively new refurbished community sports college in which lessons would often take place.

During the transition into the new academy building, both of the yet unclosed school took temporary new names. Henry Mellish being chiefly renamed "Bulwell Academy Highbury".

Academic performance
In November 1997, the school was the joint-18th worst school in England, with 6% getting 5 good GCSEs. William Crane Comprehensive School came joint-second worst in England with 2% having 5 good GCSEs, being joint-worst in England in 2003. In November 2000, the school came joint-27th worst school in England, with 9% having 5 good GCSEs. In November 2001 it came joint-17th worst in England, with 10%; William Crane had come joint-worst in England with 4%.

Henry Mellish School was judged to require special measures in 2005, but had since vastly improved - the school gained its specialist sports college status with information and communication technology (ICT) as a second specialism in March 2005. The schools GCSE results had improved dramatically over the previous six years, going from 13% of students achieving 5 A*-C grades in 2003 up to 65% in 2008 which made the school the 5th highest achieving secondary school in the city of Nottingham at the time.

Alumni
 Luke Fletcher, cricketer

As Henry Mellish Grammar School

 Robin Bailey, actor
 Sir Neil Cossons OBE, chairman from 2000 to 2003 of the Royal Commission on the Historical Monuments of England (RCHME), Chairman of the Association of Independent Museums from 1978 to 1983, and President from 2001 to 2003 of the Newcomen Society 
 Dr Sidney Holgate CBE, mathematician who founded Grey College, Durham and was the son of the woman who named the Holgate School (Hucknall)
 Pete Luckett, Canadian presenter
 Robert Raymond, filmmaker in Australia
 Dave Rowberry, pianist (briefly) in The Animals
 Prof Peter J. Taylor, Professor of Geography from 1995 to 2010 at Loughborough University, Professor of Political Geography from 1970 to 1996 at Newcastle University

Former teachers
 James Boyden, Labour MP from 1955 to 1979 for Bishop Auckland, taught History for two years in the mid-1930s

References

External links
 Bulwell Academy Official Website
 Edge academies
 EduBase

Educational institutions established in 1929
Defunct schools in Nottingham
1929 establishments in England
Educational institutions disestablished in 2009
2009 disestablishments in England